Arnold City is an unincorporated community and census-designated place in Washington Township, Fayette County, Pennsylvania, United States. As of the 2010 census, the population of Arnold City was 498.

Demographics

History
Like many towns in the area, Arnold City has been home to many coal miners supporting the coal industry in the region.  The town supported housing for several nearby coal mines, including the Naomi Mine in Fayette City. Housing was constructed by the Hillman Coal and Coke Company, creating a Coal Patch Town,

In addition to the Naomi mine, four additional mines operated in the area:
 Arnold No. 1 Mine, Arnold City, Fayette Co., PA
 Arnold No. 2 Mine, Arnold City, Fayette Co., PA
 Arnold No. 3 Mine, Arnold City, Fayette Co., PA
 Hill Top Mine & Coke Works, near Arnold City, Washington Twp., Fayette Co., PA

References

Census-designated places in Fayette County, Pennsylvania
Census-designated places in Pennsylvania